Thomas Stewart, also known as George Stewart, was a Scottish professional footballer who played as a full-back.

References

Year of birth missing
Place of birth missing
Year of death missing
Place of death missing
People from Lanarkshire
Scottish footballers
Association football defenders
Motherwell F.C. players
Glasgow Perthshire F.C. players
Third Lanark A.C. players
Partick Thistle F.C. players
Newcastle United F.C. players
Grimsby Town F.C. players
English Football League players
Scottish Football League players
Scottish Junior Football Association players